Nyamar Karbak is an Indian politician from the state of Arunachal Pradesh.

Karbak was elected from Liromoba seat in a 2015 by-election for the Arunachal Pradesh Legislative Assembly, standing as an INC candidate.

See also
Arunachal Pradesh Legislative Assembly

References

External links
Nyamar Karbak Janta Pratinidhi profile
MyNeta Profile

People's Party of Arunachal politicians
Indian National Congress politicians
Living people
Arunachal Pradesh MLAs 2019–2024
Arunachal Pradesh MLAs 2014–2019
Year of birth missing (living people)
Bharatiya Janata Party politicians from Arunachal Pradesh